Blonay Castle is a castle in the municipality of Blonay of the Canton of Vaud in Switzerland. It is a Swiss heritage site of national significance.

History 
The castle was built in 1175, by Willliam II of Blonay (died 1197), a ministerialis in Savoy, on the site of a fortified structure that dated from 1095. It has served as the Blonay family seat since that time, aside from a brief interruption in the 18th century.

The oldest remaining portion of the structure is the sturdy, square castle keep, which has been strengthened, and seen a row of buildings attached to create another courtyard. Only two of four towers remain, around an irregular rectangular plan. There is a forecourt with a Renaissance-style loggia, from 1677 on the western edge, and a chapel dating from the 15th century, with stained glass windows from 1577. Residential quarters built between the 18th and 20th centuries have undergone renovations and alterations. By the 19th century, a moat had been filled in.

Gustave Courbet created a painting of the castle in about 1875, during the artist's self-imposed exile from France, living in neighboring La Tour-de-Peilz.

Weblinks 
Commons: Schloss Blonay – Sammlung von Bildern, Videos und Audiodateien

 Bilder und Infos zum Schloss (französisch)
 Homepage der Familie de Blonay

See also
 List of castles in Switzerland
 Château

References

Further reading 
Maxime Reymond, Marc-André Genevey et Pierre de Blonay. Fondation du château de Blonay, 1984

External links

Castles in Vaud

Cultural property of national significance in the canton of Vaud